Joshua J Macrae (born 1964 in Tel Aviv, Israel) is an English drummer, audio engineer and record producer. 
Starting with a snare drum & hi hat in Primrose Hill Primary orchestra then from school punk band in Cornwall "Inconvenience" he left school & toured Europe with local band "Metro Glider". Upon return he moved to Bath & became a founder member of "Still Life", later renamed "Wadi Vision", show casing at The Embassy Club & doing a "Live In Maida Vale" Radio One session For Bruno Brooks. With the demise of "Wadi Vision" he played various sessions, did a short promotional tour of Europe with Spandau Ballet standing in for John Keeble who remained home with his expectant wife. In '87, answering an advert in the back of The Melody Maker, he landed the drum throne in Roger Taylor's band The Cross. and went on to co-produce all of Taylor's solo albums from 1992 on, played drums at Roger Taylor's solo concerts and works with Queen in the studio from 1992.

Selected discography
 The Cross: Shove It (1988)
 The Cross: Mad, Bad and Dangerous to Know (1990)
 The Cross: Blue Rock (1991)
 Queen+: The Freddie Mercury Tribute Concert (DVD, 2002; percussion)
 Queen: Queen Rock Montreal (2007)
 Queen: Hungarian Rhapsody: Queen Live in Budapest (2012)
 Queen: Live at the Rainbow '74 (2014)
 Queen: Queen Forever (2014)
 Queen: On Air (2016)

And many more

References 

English rock drummers
British male drummers
English record producers
Living people
1964 births
The Cross (band) members